The Acropolis International Basketball Tournament (also known as the Acropolis of Athens Basketball Tournament and the Acropolis Basketball Cup) (Greek: Τουρνουά Ακρόπολις) is an international basketball competition that is played between national teams, which has been held almost every year since 1986, and takes place in Athens, Greece, during the summer. It takes place before the big official FIBA tournaments like the EuroBasket, the FIBA World Cup, and the Summer Olympic Games. The tournament is named after the Athenian Acropolis. The competition is played under FIBA rules.

The tournament is organized by the Hellenic Basketball Federation.

Venues

History
The tournament's host team, the senior men's Greek National Basketball Team, has won the tournament 18 times so far, last one 2022. In 1991, the Hellenic Basketball Federation and FIBA Europe, joined together to hold the special edition 1991 FIBA Centennial Jubilee tournament, commemorating the 100th anniversary of the sport of basketball. The Centennial Jubilee Tournament is not counted with the other Acropolis Tournaments, because it was not solely organized by the Hellenic Basketball Federation.

To date, there have been 29 official Acropolis Tournaments that have been organized by the Hellenic Basketball Federation, plus the unofficial special edition 1991 FIBA Centennial Jubilee Tournament. The Greek national team did not host the 2012 Acropolis Tournament, because it participated in the 2012 FIBA World Olympic qualifying tournament, and failed to qualify for the Olympics that year. There was also no Acropolis Tournament in the years 2014, 2016, 2018 and 2020.

Acropolis Tournament standings

Medals Summary

Results by country

MVP Awards

Top scorer by country 

Key:
TPS - Total Points Scored
GP - Game played
PPG - Points per game
TTP - Tournament total points

FIBA Centennial Jubilee Tournament

The 1991 FIBA Centennial Jubilee tournament was the special edition tournament that was organized jointly by FIBA Europe and the Hellenic Basketball Federation to commemorate the 100 year anniversary of the sport of basketball. It is not counted officially with the other 27 Acropolis International Tournaments because it was not solely organized by the Hellenic Basketball Federation. It was contested by France, Greece, Italy, Yugoslavia, Spain, and the Soviet Union.

See also 
 Basketball at the Summer Olympics
 FIBA Basketball World Cup
 FIBA Asia Cup
 FIBA Diamond Ball
 Adecco Cup
 Marchand Continental Championship Cup
 Belgrade Trophy
 Stanković Cup
 William Jones Cup

References

External links

Hellenic Basketball Federation Official Website 
Basket.gr Acropolis Cup History Search Results 
Acropolis Cup Archive Results

 
International basketball competitions hosted by Greece
Annual sports competitions in Athens
Basketball competitions in Europe between national teams